Progress 38 was a Soviet uncrewed Progress cargo spacecraft, which was launched in September 1988 to resupply the Mir space station.

Launch
Progress 38 launched on 9 September 1988 from the Baikonur Cosmodrome in the Kazakh SSR. It used a Soyuz-U2 rocket.

Docking
Progress 38 docked with the aft port of the Kvant-1 module of Mir on 12 September 1988 at 01:22:28 UTC, and was undocked on 23 November 1988 at 12:12:46 UTC.

Decay
It remained in orbit until 23 November 1988, when it was deorbited. The deorbit burn occurred at 18:26:00 UTC and the mission ended at 19:06:58 UTC.

See also

 1988 in spaceflight
 List of Progress missions
 List of uncrewed spaceflights to Mir

References

Progress (spacecraft) missions
1988 in the Soviet Union
Spacecraft launched in 1988
Spacecraft which reentered in 1988
Spacecraft launched by Soyuz-U rockets